Chico Bon Bon: Monkey with a Tool Belt is a children's animated streaming television series based on a series of books of the same name by Chris Monroe. The series is set in Blunderburg and revolves around Chico Bon Bon (voice of Robbie Daymond) and his friends Clark the elephant, Rainbow Thunder the daredevil cat and Tiny the mouse trying to solve problems using STEM concepts.

A holiday special Chico Bon Bon and the Very Berry Holiday was released on December 3, 2020.

Characters

Main
 Chico Bon Bon (voiced by Robbie Daymond): A male monkey with a sweatband, a pair of sneakers, and his titular iconic tool belt. Chico is the leader of his Fix-it Force friends, and while smart, he tends to forget things and can often lose track easily. Chico uses a wide variety of tools, and has access to many kinds of parts the job may need.
 Rainbow Thunder (voiced by Dayci Brookshire): A female cat with a white bodysuit. Rainbow is the Fix-it Force's main driver, often operating Tool Force 1, the Fix-it Flyer helicopter and her own Glittercycle. True to her outfit, Rainbow tends to be a bit of a daredevil, and she often performs at stadium events when not hanging with her friends. Rainbow also describes the STEM concepts in every episode.
 Clark (voiced by Anthony Tedesco): A male elephant in a red tracksuit with white stripes. Clark is the gentle giant of the Fix-it Force, and because of this, his personality is noticeably a lot more timid compared to his friends. Clark is the math and science expert of the Fix-it Force, and he often calculates the specifications of the materials needed for the Fix-it Force's latest projects. Clark also pilots the accordingly-named Clark-copter, a spheroid helicopter stored on the roof of Tool Force 1.
 Tiny: A miniature mouse who lives and works with the Fix-it Force. Tiny is noticeably much more athletic than the rest of the Fix-it Force, often using martial arts skills along with her small size to work her way out of delicate situations. Tiny is the only Fix-It Force member who doesn't wear clothing on a regular basis, and unlike the others, she has dot eyes and she doesn't speak.

Recurring
 Mr. Buster McFluster (voiced by Cole Seaver): A male rabbit who does multiple jobs around Blunderberg.
 Neil Ostrich: A male ostrich who does multiple news reports around Blunderburg. In the episode Egg-mergency, it is revealed he has a wife named Nell Ostrich, and later in the episode, they had a daughter named Nina Ostrich. Since Season 4, there has been a small running gag in that he loses his hair to the wind.
 Mr. Dunderhead: A male beaver who acts as a construction worker around Blunderberg. He is a bit clumsy in the episodes Underwear Parade (where he listens to music while Chico is asking him to give the royal undies), & Wrecking Ball Run (Where he builds a tall wall instead of a small wall as Mayor Murphy asked). He is among several identically designed characters known as the dunderheads, appropriately named such in the fact that they always seem to cause mishaps due to misunderstandings.
 Mayor Murphy: A female poodle who is the mayor of Blunderberg. 
 Elkin John: A male moose (named after the animal's Eurasian name) who is Clark's favorite singer. In the episode Chico Bon Bon and the Doggy Dilemma, it shows that he has a dog named Bernie. He is a spoof of musician Elton John.
 Herb: A male hermit crab who lives in Crabby Canyon. He likes to eat piping hot food, and tends to becomes crabby if he doesn't get any. 
 Mrs. Coleslaw: An elderly female skunk who is the Fix-it-Force's neighbor. She is one of the Fix-it-Force's most frequent clients. 
 Captain Squirrelbeard (voiced by Matthew Mercer): A male squirrel pirate who sails in a pirate ship with a hot air balloon. Squirrelbeard is animated differently than other squirrels in the show, as he has a properly proportioned snout, he doesn't have stick-limbs, and he has eyes with pupils instead of dot eyes. Squirrelbeard is also named for his distinctive beard and the fact that his tail has a large chunk of it bitten off.
 Sprinkles: A titanic pink female octopus who is Captain Squirrelbeard's friend. She likes to eat ice cream, and once rampaged through Blunderburg until she had a belly full of it.
 The Lemurettis (Betty and Freddy): A couple of lemurs with Italian accents who run several restaurant chains in Blunderburg. Betty is yellow while Freddy is Orange.
 Storm Cloud Lightning: A male daredevil cat who only appeared in "Spatula Showdown". He is a male version of Rainbow Thunder.
 Conductor Clyde (voiced by Eric Bauza): A male dog who is the conductor of the Choo-Choo Express, a very fast train that runs through Blunderburg.
 Big Phil: A male porcupine and a neighbor of Ms. Coleslaw. He likes to go jogging when it is dark out, though he usually ends up tearing surrounding objects with his quills
 The Yum Yums (Gum Gum & Tum Tum): A pair of aliens from the planet Zum Zum who primarily feed on toast. Their original plan was to strip Blunderburg of all of its toast before Chico and the Fix-it Force made a toaster that worked on their planet.
 Elsa: A female pig who is Rainbow's cousin. She has a toddler named Ricky Pig, who doesn't hold any interest in things that aren't races or games.

Cast
 Robbie Daymond as Chico Bon Bon
 Dayci Brookshire as Rainbow Thunder
 Anthony Tedesco as Clark
 Chrissie Fit as Tiny
 Blu Bishop as Dr. Merv
 Emma Sloan Jacobs
 Roberta Lemons
 Joanna Lewis
 Ian Nikus
 Cole Seaver
 Matthew Mercer

Episodes

Season 1 (2020)

Season 2 (2020)

Season 3 (2020)

Season 4 (2020)

Holiday Special

Release News
Chico Bon Bon: Monkey with a Tool Belt was released on May 8, 2020 on Netflix.

References

External links
 
 

2020 American television series debuts
2020s American animated television series
2020s American children's television series
2020 British television series debuts
2020s British animated television series
2020s British children's television series
American children's animated adventure television series
American children's animated comedy television series
American computer-animated television series
American preschool education television series
British children's animated adventure television series
British children's animated comedy television series
British computer-animated television series
British preschool education television series
Irish children's animated adventure television series
Irish children's animated comedy television series
Irish preschool education television series
Animated television series about cats
Animated television series about elephants
Animated television series about mice and rats
Animated television series about monkeys
English-language Netflix original programming
Netflix children's programming
Animated television series by Netflix
Television series by Brown Bag Films
Television series by Sony Pictures Television
Animated preschool education television series
2020s preschool education television series
Television series created by Bob Boyle